The 2019 WK League was the eleventh season of the WK League, the top division of women's football in South Korea. The regular season began on 15 April and ended on 31 October 2019.

Incheon Hyundai Steel Red Angels were the Champions for the seventh successive season.

Teams

Foreign players
The total number of foreign players was restricted to three per club, including a slot for a player from the Asian Football Confederation countries.

Table

Results

Matches 1 to 14

Matches 15 to 28

Play-offs
The semi-final was played as a single-elimination match, and the Championship Final over two legs.

Semi-final

Championship final
First leg

Second leg

References

External links
WK League official website 
WK League on Soccerway

2019
Women
South Korea
South Korea